Ivo Lul Diogo, better known as Ivo Diogo (January 12, 1935 in São Borja, Rio Grande do Sul – July 7, 2009 in Porto Alegre), was a Brazilian football (soccer) player, who played as a midfielder.

Clubs
 Internacional: 1955 - 1960
 Newells Old Boys: 1961
 Grêmio: 1962
 San Lorenzo: 1963 - 1964

Honours
 Campeonato Gaúcho: 1955, 1961.

References

1935 births
2009 deaths
Sportspeople from Rio Grande do Sul
Brazilian footballers
Association football forwards
Sport Club Internacional players
San Lorenzo de Almagro footballers